Samuel Lee Gash Jr. (born March 7, 1969) is an American former football fullback in the National Football League (NFL).

Professional career
He was drafted in the eighth round of the 1992 NFL Draft by the New England Patriots.  A two time Pro Bowler in his twelve-year career, Gash played for the Patriots (1992–1997), Buffalo Bills (1998–1999, 2003), and the Baltimore Ravens (2000–2002).
In 1999, Gash earned the unique distinction of being the first back in NFL history to be selected to the Pro Bowl without carrying the ball at all during the regular season.
He won a Super Bowl in 2000 with the Baltimore Ravens. Gash was cut by the New Orleans Saints one day before the 2004 training camp began.

Coaching
Gash began his coaching career in 2005 with the New York Jets as an assistant running backs coach. In January 2007, Gash was hired as the Detroit Lions' assistant special teams coach.  In 2008, he became the Lions' running backs coach. Gash was fired by the Lions on December 31, 2012.

On February 10, 2014, Gash was announced as the running backs coach of the Green Bay Packers. On January 19, 2016, he was fired by the Packers.

Personal life
Gash has relatives also involved with football. His younger brother, Eric, played outside linebacker at the University of North Carolina. In 2014 Eric Gash was selected as the head coach at his alma mater, Hendersonville High School, for the 2014 season. He is only the second African American hired as a head football coach at a western North Carolina high school since the late 1960s integration of public schools. The Gash brothers have a cousin, Thane, who played safety for the Cleveland Browns and San Francisco 49ers. His son, Isaiah, plays college football for the Michigan Wolverines.

Notes and references

External links
 Detroit Lions Bio
 Klingaman, Mike. "Catching up with...Ravens fullback Sam Gash," The Toy Department (The Baltimore Sun sports blog), Thursday, October 21, 2010.

1969 births
Living people
People from Hendersonville, North Carolina
African-American players of American football
African-American coaches of American football
American football fullbacks
Penn State Nittany Lions football players
New England Patriots players
Buffalo Bills players
Baltimore Ravens players
New Orleans Saints players
American Conference Pro Bowl players
New York Jets coaches
Detroit Lions coaches
Green Bay Packers coaches
21st-century African-American people
20th-century African-American sportspeople
Ed Block Courage Award recipients